Bhim Singh (10 March 1768 – 30 March 1828), was the 26th Maharana (r. 1778–1828) of the Mewar region and the 1st Maharana of the Princely state of Udaipur. He was a son of Maharana Ari Singh II and younger brother of Maharana Hamir Singh II.

At ten years of age, Bhim Singh succeeded his brother, Hamir Singh II, who had died at 16 years of age from a wound when a rifle burst in his hand.  Hamir Singh II had ruled an unstable state with an empty treasury under a regency by Maharaj Baghsingh and Arjunsingh.  Bhim Singh inherited this unstable state, after its unpaid Maratha soldiers had looted Chittor.  The soldiers' depredations continued and more territory was lost during Bhim Singh's rule. Bhim Singh had a daughter Krishna Kumari, who died by drinking poison, at the age of 16, to save his dynasty in 1810.

Bhim Singh was a weak ruler in a succession of ineffectual leaders. Mewar had once been considered the strongest Rajput state because of its lengthy resistance to the foreign emperors, but by 13 January 1818, Bhim Singh had to sign a treaty with the British, accepting their protection.

On the birth of his heir, Bhim Singh along with his nobles visited the Eklingji temple on foot and got an inscription engraved in the temple promulgating orders to abolish certain taxes from Charanas and Brahmins. 

On his death in 1828, his four wives and four concubines committed Sati in the traditional manner.

References 

Mewar dynasty
1768 births
1828 deaths